Jerzy Wojnar (7 October 1930 in Lwów – 2 February 2005 in Warsaw) was a Polish pilot and luger who competed from the mid-1950s to the late 1960s. He won the three medals in the men's singles event at the FIL World Luge Championships with two golds (1958, 1961) and one silver (1962).

Wojnar competed in two Winter Olympics, earning his best finish of eighth in the men's singles event at Grenoble in 1968.

References
Hickok sports information on World champions in luge and skeleton.
Wallechinsky, David. (1984). "Luge - Men's singles". The Complete Book of the Olympics: 1896-1980. New York: Penguin Books. p. 575.

1930 births
2005 deaths
Lugers at the 1964 Winter Olympics
Lugers at the 1968 Winter Olympics
Polish male lugers
Olympic lugers of Poland
Sportspeople from Lviv
Polish aviators